Yanga Football Club is a football club based in Nyahururu, Kenya. They currently play in the Central Province of the Kenyan Provincial League, the third tier of the Kenyan football league system, after being relegated from Zone B of FKF Division One after the 2012 season. The team plays its home matches at the Nyahururu Municipal Stadium.

Football clubs in Kenya